Screw 32 is a Berkeley/East Bay-area US punk rock band.
Their name has many supposed origins, the most popular stating that it is derived from an anti-skateboarding measure on the ballot in Concord, California. They were noted for their self-publicity and ordered stickers by the thousands, sticking them in numerous places. They were also known to "tag" their names with Sharpies on numerous objects and in numerous places.

Members of the band later played in several other bands; vocalist Andrew "Andrew Champion" Ataie went on to Hopelifter, End of the World, Shadowboxer, and Highwire Days; guitarist Doug Sangalang played with Limp, One Time Angels, and Jackson United; and bass player Jimi Cheetah played in Tilt and Nothing Cool, as well as running Cheetah's Records. Guitarist Grant McIntire and drummer Mark Mortenson had a brief stint in Me First and the Gimme Gimmes, while Mark Mortenson played in the bands Grinch and Samiam. Grant McIntire and Andrew Champion also played in the band Dance Hall Crashers.

Screw 32's music has been likened to that of the Bouncing Souls, AFI, and Dag Nasty.

History

One of the first East Coast-influenced hardcore-style bands to come out of the East Bay in the early 90's, Screw 32 went on a string of United States and Canadian tours with many popular punk rock bands of their era, and they headlined their last few tours. Influenced by the bands that were coming up in the area (e.g., Rancid, Green Day, AFI, and others), they led by example and also incorporated other bands' concepts into their own effort.

The band started when Grant McIntire and Andrew Champion were at a coffee shop complaining about the state of the local music scene and their friend Shea Walters walked up and told them to, "Stop whining and start their own band." Grant and Andrew had been in two bands previously and had been friends since grade school when Grant moved to the Bay Area from New York. Doug Sangalang was playing at the time with Jesse Michaels' (of Operation Ivy) current project, Big Rig, and joined Screw 32 a few weeks into the band's rehearsal endeavors  which resulted in a key role in sculpting Screw 32's melodic blend of D.C.-style hardcore and L.A. punk. Jimi Cheetah and Josh Kilbourn were the original rhythm section.

When Screw 32 first formed, they were inseparable from AFI, and the two bands would help each other get shows, throwing each other on as support for whatever shows they would get. Both bands got too big after a while to play together, to the point where they would have to jump on stage to play at 924 Gilman Street. They were not permitted to play at Gilman St. due to the size of the crowd and inherent security problems.
Their first tour was with Los Angeles legends Youth Brigade, who were a major influence on the band and helped them out getting started. Screw 32 did at least five full tours with the Bouncing Souls and was also heavily influenced by them, due to their "no-holds-barred," all-out touring ethic.

The last show for Screw 32 was at Boarderline Warehouse near Twain Harte, California in April 1997, run by a friend of theirs named Mark Kirkman (who ran the now famous BullPen skateboard shop in Danville, California where the San Ramon and Danville straightedge scene was born and in extension the Northern California straightedge hardcore scene was also born with such bands as Unit Pride, Breakaway, Rabid Lassie, No Reason and many others) with Citizen Fish (ex-Subhumans), The Criminals, and Fury 66 from Santa Cruz, CA. The tension in the band had grown to such a level that many of them were not speaking when they took the stage that night, Andrew actually stood still and did not make a noise through an entire song at one point and then  played 'One Time Angels' as their last song ever, he turned to the guys afterwards and said, 'Thanks, I quit' (Fat Wreck Chords released a compilation LP with the Screw 32 song 'Painless' on it with a cartoon of four characters looking sadly at one cartoon with a bubble above him that says, 'I quit'. With two large tours booked, two records left on their contract, and about a million t-shirts, the band had run its course.

The band reformed in the Spring of 2016 with guitarist Zac Hunter "The Butcher" of The Nerve Agents  bassist Dustin Tyler "dbc" Kanel and Jude Ramirez joining original members Andrew Champion on vocals and Grant McIntire on guitar. They recorded an EP with Andy Ernst at Art Of Ears studio that will be released in the spring of 2023 as well as a contribution to the Sell The Heart Records Fugazi tribute album with the song"Public Witness Program".

Members

Grant McIntire, Andrew Champion, Douglas Sangalang, Jimi Cheetah (McCluskey), Grant McIntire and Josh Kilbourn  were the original members of the band. Jamie Morrison played a few tours and a lot of shows in between Josh and ultimately Mark Mortenson who played on their last record and all of their remaining shows, recordings, and tours.

Discography
1994: This is Berkeley, Not West Bay compilation 7" w/ AFI (band), Black Fork, and Dead and Gone - (Zafio Records)
1994: Old Idea, New Head b/w Tightrope – (Scooter's Records)
1994: Why Are We So Fucked Up All the Time? 7" – (Harvcore Records)
1995: Split 7" w/ Youth Brigade – (BYO Records)
1995: Unresolved Childhood Issues – (Wingnut Records)
1996: Split 7" w/ Fury 66 – (Half Pint Records)
1997: Under the Influence of Bad People – (Fat Wreck Chords)
• 2016: Sell The Heart Records Fugazi compilation, ‘Public Witness Program’

References

External links
[ Allmusic]

Punk rock groups from California
Fat Wreck Chords artists
Musical groups from Berkeley, California